The Clifton Rice House is a historic house located at 714 Claremore Drive in West Palm Beach, Florida.

Description and history 
It was added to the National Register of Historic Places on April 26, 1996, and is a contributing property to the Flamingo Park Historic Residential District.

References

External links

 Palm Beach County listings at National Register of Historic Places

Houses on the National Register of Historic Places in Florida
National Register of Historic Places in Palm Beach County, Florida
Houses in Palm Beach County, Florida
Mediterranean Revival architecture in Florida
Houses completed in 1927